The women's doubles competition at the 1992 Australian Open was held between January 13 and 26, 1992 at the National Tennis Centre at Flinders Park in Melbourne, Australia. Arantxa Sánchez Vicario and Helena Suková won the title, defeating Mary Joe Fernández and Zina Garrison in the final.

Seeds

Draw

Finals

Top half

Section 1

Section 2

Bottom half

Section 3

Section 4

References
 Main Draw

External links
 1992 Australian Open – Women's draws and results at the International Tennis Federation

Women's Doubles
Australian Open (tennis) by year – Women's doubles
1992 in Australian women's sport
1992 in women's tennis